The following lists events that happened during 1875 in New Zealand.

Incumbents

Regal and viceregal
Head of State — Queen Victoria
Governor — The Marquess of Normanby

Government and law
The 1875 general election begins on 29 December but does not finish until 4 January the following year. The election marks the end of the 5th New Zealand Parliament.

Speaker of the House — The sitting Speaker, Sir Francis Dillon Bell, does not stand in the 1875 election at the end of the year. He will be replaced by Sir William Fitzherbet in 1876.
Premier — Daniel Pollen becomes Premier on 6 July replacing Julius Vogel.
Minister of Finance — Harry Atkinson takes over from Julius Vogel on 6 July.
Chief Justice — Hon Sir George Arney retires and is replaced on 1 April by Hon Sir James Prendergast

Main centre leaders
Mayor of Auckland — Frederick Prime followed by Benjamin Tonks
Mayor of Christchurch — Fred Hobbs
Mayor of Dunedin — Andrew Mercer followed by Keith Ramsay
Mayor of Wellington — William Sefton Moorhouse

Events 
 Contract let for construction of the Rimutaka Incline railway using the Fell system.

Sport

Athletics
The first club in the country, the Wellington Amateur Athletic Club, holds its first meeting.

Cricket
The Wellington Cricket Association is formed.

Horse racing
New Zealand Cup winner: Nectar
New Zealand Derby winner: Daniel O’Rourke
Auckland Cup winner: Kingfisher
Wellington Cup winner: Tambourini

see also :Category:Horse races in New Zealand.

Rugby union
 Rugby union begins in Timaru, Temuka, Blenheim, Picton, Greymouth (with the formation of new clubs) and Napier where the club formed in 1874 adopted rugby rules.
 A combined Auckland clubs team toured Wellington, Christchurch, Dunedin, Nelson and New Plymouth. They lost all matches, despite some of their opposition having only learned rugby rules for a few weeks in preparation for the tour – the Christchurch and Dunedin clubs had primarily been playing football (soccer).

Shooting
Ballinger Belt: Lieutenant Skinner (Auckland)

Births
 19 January: Ethel Benjamin, first female lawyer in NZ.
 23 March: Alexander Young, politician.
 6 June: William Polson, politician.
 16 June: Richard Lawson, teacher, university professor and educationalist.
 25 July: Elsie Dohrmann, scholar, teacher and temperance campaigner
 7 November: Frank Milner, headmaster and educationalist.

Unknown date
 John Robertson, politician.

Deaths 
 15 March: William Turnbull Swan, politician (born 1828) 
 29 May: James Mackay, politician (born 1804). 
 31 July: Thomas Beckham, politician (born 1810) 
 8 August: William Tolmie, politician (born 1833).
 12 August: John Parkin Taylor, politician (born 1812).
 17 October: Archibald Clark, politician (born 1805).
 23 December: Felix Wakefield, colonist (born 1807)

See also
List of years in New Zealand
Timeline of New Zealand history
History of New Zealand
Military history of New Zealand
Timeline of the New Zealand environment
Timeline of New Zealand's links with Antarctica

References
General
 Romanos, J. (2001) New Zealand Sporting Records and Lists. Auckland: Hodder Moa Beckett. 
Specific

External links